Borka: The Adventures of a Goose with No Feathers is a children's picture book written and illustrated by John Burningham and published by Jonathan Cape in 1963.  It features a goose born without feathers, whose mother knits a jersey that helps in some ways.

About the book
Borka was Burningham's first published book as an author or illustrator.
For it he won the 1963 Kate Greenaway Medal from the Library Association, recognising the year's best children's book illustration by a British subject. For the 50th anniversary of the Medal (1955–2005), a panel of experts named it one of the top ten winning works, which composed the ballot for a public election of the nation's favourite.

Publication history
Random House published the U.S. edition in February 1964 (44 pages).

Review
According to Kirkus Reviews, Borka is an ugly duckling who "does not undergo a transformation; she is as bald as a goose as she was when a gosling. ... The freely stylized illustrations in bold lines and appropriate, vivid colors are many and strong."

See also
 "The Ugly Duckling"

References

External links
  
 "Formats and editions of Borka" at WorldCat
 "Flights of fancy: It's 40 years since Borka ...", The Guardian 7 March 2003
 "John Burningham – a life in pictures", a 13-picture gallery, The Guardian 21 March 2011 — includes two pages from Borka

1963 children's books
British children's books
British picture books
Fictional geese
Books about birds
Jonathan Cape books
Kate Greenaway Medal winning works